Alex McDonald (born 13 February 1970) is a former Australian rules footballer who played 107 senior games for Hawthorn (1990–95) and Collingwood (1996–99) in the Australian Football League (AFL). He was the number one draft pick of the 1988 National Draft. He made his debut in round 11 of the 1990 AFL season.

References

External links

Australian rules footballers from Victoria (Australia)
Hawthorn Football Club players
Collingwood Football Club players
1970 births
Living people
People educated at St Patrick's College, Ballarat